Saleem Zia is a Pakistani politician who is currently a member of Senate of Pakistan, representing Pakistan Muslim League (N).

Political career

He was elected to the Senate of Pakistan as a candidate of Pakistan Muslim League (N) in 2015 Pakistani Senate election.

References

Living people
Pakistani senators (14th Parliament)
Awami National Party politicians
Year of birth missing (living people)